The Men's 100 metre freestyle S4 event at the 2016 Paralympic Games took place on 8 September 2016, at the Olympic Aquatics Stadium. Two heats were held. The swimmers with the eight fastest times advanced to the final.

Heats

Heat 1 
10:32 8 September 2016:

Heat 2 
10:37 8 September 2016:

Final 
18:33 8 September 2016:

Notes

Swimming at the 2016 Summer Paralympics